Piao Wenyao (born April 25, 1988) is a  Chinese professional Go player of Korean ethnicity currently residing in Harbin, Heilongjiang.

Biography 
Piao became a professional player at the age of 11 in 1999. He was promoted to a rank of 3 dan in 2001, and is currently 9 dan. Piao achieved his first international breakthrough in 2011 by winning the 15th LG Cup, defeating compatriot Kong Jie by a score of 2-0.  Prior to winning the LG Cup, Piao's other international achievement was coming in runners up in the World Oza, where he lost 2-0 to Gu Li in the finals.

Promotion record

Titles and runners-up 

Total: 3 titles, 4 runners-up.

References

Living people
1988 births
Chinese Go players
Chinese people of Korean descent
Sportspeople from Harbin